Wahlsten may refer to:

Places
Wahlsten, Minnesota, an unincorporated community in Saint Louis County, Minnesota, United States

People
Douglas Wahlsten (born 1943), Canadian neuroscientist and psychologist
Edvin Wahlstén (1872–1945), Finnish journalist and civil servant
Kauko Wahlsten (1923–2001), Finnish rower
Juhani Wahlsten (born 1938), Finnish ice hockey player
Sami Wahlsten (born 1967), Finnish ice hockey player